Kaiserstuhl may refer to:

 Kaiserstuhl (Aargau), a town in the Swiss canton of Aargau
 Kaiserstuhl (Baden-Württemberg), a mountain range in the German state of Baden-Württemberg
 Kaiserstuhl (Obwalden), a settlement in the municipality of Lungern in the Swiss canton of Obwalden
 Kaiserstuhl (South Australia), a mountain in the Australian state of South Australia
 Kaiserstuhl (asteroid), a main belt asteroid
 Kaiserstuhl (coal mine), a coal mine in the German city of Dortmund
 Kaiserstuhl (coking plant), a former coking plant in the German city of Dortmund
 Kaiserstuhl (throne), the throne of the German emperors and kings

See also
 Kaiserstuhl Conservation Park
 Kaiserstuhl Railway
 Kaiserstuhl railway station (disambiguation)